Patriarch Methodius of Constantinople may refer to:

 Methodius I of Constantinople, Ecumenical Patriarch in 843–847
 Methodius II of Constantinople, Ecumenical Patriarch in 1240
 Methodius III of Constantinople, Ecumenical Patriarch in 1668–1671